The 2016 Spanish Athletics Championships was the 96th edition of the national championship in outdoor track and field for Spain. It was held on 23 and 24 July at the Las Mestas Sports Complex in Gijón. It served as the selection meeting for Spain at the 2016 European Athletics Championships.

The club championships in relays and combined track and field events were contested separately from the main competition.

Results

Men

Women

Medal table

Notes

References
Results
XCVI Campeonato de España Absoluto . Royal Spanish Athletics Federation. Retrieved 2019-06-28.

External links 
 Official website of the Royal Spanish Athletics Federation 

2016
Spanish Athletics Championships
Spanish Championships
Athletics Championships
Sport in Gijón